Eressa deliana is a moth of the family Erebidae. It was described by Roepke in 1935. It is found on Sumatra.

References

 Natural History Museum Lepidoptera generic names catalog

Eressa
Moths described in 1935